The Orinoco sea catfish (Cathorops nuchalis) is a species of catfish in the family Ariidae. It was described by Albert Günther in 1864. It is a tropical, fresh and saltwater catfish which occurs between Venezuela and Guyana.

References

Ariidae
Fish described in 1864
Taxa named by Albert Günther